Galaxy is a 1980 album by the French band Rockets. The album was recorded at Rockland Studios in Paris, but mixed and mastered in Milan.

Track listing
All Songs Written By Gérard L'Her & Alain Maratrat, except where noted. (Published By Editions Gavroche)
 "Galactica" 4:44
 "Mecanic Bionic" (L'Her, Alain Groetzinger) 4:47
 "Synthetic Man" 4:51
 "One More Mission" (L'Her) 4:20
 "Universal Band" 4:07
 "Prophecy" (Maratrat) 3:30
 "In the Black Hole" (L'Her) 6:00
 "In the Galaxy" 5:10
 "Medley" 2:30

Personnel
Christian LeBartz - Lead Vocals
Alain Maratrat - Electric Guitar, Keyboards, Backing Vocals
Fabrice Quagliotti - Keyboards, Synthesizers
Gérard L'Her - Bass, Backing Vocals
Alain Groetzinger - Drums, Percussion

Certifications

Reference List

1980 albums
Rockets (band) albums